Wang Liqin (born June 18, 1978, Shanghai) is a retired Mainland Chinese table tennis player. As of January 2014, he is ranked 12th in the International Table Tennis Federation (ITTF). He began playing at the age of 6 and was picked for the Chinese men's national squad in 1993 when he was only 15 years old. He holds three majors (3 World Championships). He has been ranked #1 by ITTF for 25 consecutive months, from September 2000 to September 2002, which is the second-longest period for being consecutive #1 of the world as of January 2011. At the end of 2013, Wang Liqin retired from the national team.

Style/Equipment 

Wang changes his playing equipment often. He has perhaps used more than 10 different model of rackets, some of them for a longer period of time, e.g. The Butterfly Timo Boll Spirit, Stiga Clipper CR, Offensive CR, Rosewood V, DHS Hurricane King II, III, and some Nittaku's models. His main forehand rubber is DHS Hurricane II, III, TG III. It is said that he had used Nittaku Hammond, the Tenergy series, and many other rubbers for his backhand.

Wang Liqin uses the shakehand grip. He plays a forehand dominated style with the occasional backhand loop to open a topspin rally. His above average height allows him additional leverage for acceleration and momentum, creating more powerful shots. Many often describe him as possessing one of the most unusual and powerful forehand shots.

Awards 
Wang won the gold medal in doubles at the 2000 Summer Olympics in Sydney, Australia, and the bronze medal in singles at the 2004 Summer Olympics held in Athens, Greece, as well as at the 2008 Summer Olympics held in Beijing, China. At the 2008 Summer Olympics Wang won gold medal in team competition with Ma Lin and Wang Hao. For most of 2004–6, he ranked as the world's best table tennis player.

Wang Liqin won his first World Championship in Osaka, Japan in 2001. In 2003, Wang made it to the quarter-finals of the World Table Tennis Championships. He has since won two more World Championships – 48th WTTC 2005 in Shanghai, China and 49th WTTC 2007 in Zagreb, Croatia. Wang Liqin is ranked #12 in the world for Men's Singles, based on the ITTF World Ranking page as of January 2014(www.ittf.com).

Pro Tour winner  (×21):
Lebanon Open (1998), Swedish Open (1999), USA Open, China Open, Japan  Open, Denmark Open (2000), China Open, England Open, Sweden Open (2001), China Open (2002). Germany Open, Swedish Open (2003), China Open, Korean Open, Singapore Open (2004), Qatar Open, China Open (Shenzen), China Open (Harbin) (2005), Qatar Open, Japan Open (2006), Qatar Open (2010)
Runner-up  (×10):
Qatar Open, Japan Open (1997), France Open (1999), China Open (Kunshan), China Open (Guangzhou) (2006), Qatar (2007), China Open (2007), China Open (2008), China Open (2009), China Open (2012)

Men's doubles
Pro Tour winner  (23): 
France Open (1996), Yugoslavian Open (1997), Japan Open (1997), Qatar Open (1998), China Open (1999), China Open (2000). Sweden Open, China Open (2001), Denmark Open, Qatar Open (2002), Japan Open (2004), China Open (2005), Qatar Open, China Open (Kunshan), China Open (Shenzen) (2006), Hungarian Open, Japan Open, German Open (2007),  Korea Open (2008), England Open (2009), Sweden Open, Qatar Open (2011), China Open (2012)
Runner-up (23)
Sweden Open, Japan Open, Austrian Open, Brazil Open (1997), Malaysia Open, China Open, Australia Open (1998), USA Open, Denmark Open, Brazil Open (2000), China Open (2002), Japan Open (2003), Japan Open, Singapore Open (2006), China Open (2007), Qatar Open (2009), China Open, Kuwait Open, Qatar Open (2010), UAE Open (2011)

He is included in ITTF hall of fame. Currently he is serving as a coach of his Shanghai team at Chinese super league.

See also 
 Table tennis
 List of table tennis players
 World Table Tennis Championships
 Sport in China

References

External links 
Career profile of Wang Liqin Table Tennis Master
Biography at CCTV.com
Wang Liqin at Table Tennis Media

1978 births
Living people
Medalists at the 2004 Summer Olympics
Medalists at the 2008 Summer Olympics
Olympic bronze medalists for China
Olympic gold medalists for China
Olympic medalists in table tennis
Olympic table tennis players of China
Shanghai Jiao Tong University alumni
Table tennis players at the 2000 Summer Olympics
Asian Games medalists in table tennis
Table tennis players at the 1998 Asian Games
Table tennis players at the 2002 Asian Games
Table tennis players at the 2004 Summer Olympics
Table tennis players at the 2008 Summer Olympics
Table tennis players from Shanghai
Chinese male table tennis players
Chinese table tennis coaches
Medalists at the 2000 Summer Olympics
Asian Games gold medalists for China
Medalists at the 1998 Asian Games
Medalists at the 2002 Asian Games
Universiade medalists in table tennis
Asian Games bronze medalists for China
World Table Tennis Championships medalists
Universiade gold medalists for China